Canta Province is a province in the Lima Region of Peru, situated approximately  to the northeast of the Peruvian capital, Lima.

Geography 
Other mountains are listed below:

Political division
The province is divided into seven districts.

 Arahuay (Arahuay)
 Canta (Canta)
 Huamantanga (Huamantanga)
 Huaros (Huaros)
 Lachaqui (Lachaqui)
 San Buenaventura (San Buenaventura)
 Santa Rosa de Quives (Yangas)

Sources and notes

Provinces of the Lima Region